Live at the Whisky: One Night Only is a live album by Vince Neil, lead vocalist of heavy metal band Mötley Crüe, recorded at the Whisky a Go Go.

Content
The album includes songs originally performed by Mötley Crüe with the exception of "Look in Her Eyes" which originally appeared on Neil's 1993 solo album Exposed. On the album's cover art, the sign on the nightclub identifies it as "The Whisky" as opposed to its actual name, "Whisky a Go Go".

Track listing
 "Kickstart My Heart"  (Sixx)  6:22 
 "Knock 'Em Dead, Kid"  (Neil, Sixx)  3:41 
 "Look in Her Eyes"  (Neil, Soussan, Stevens)  5:37 
 "Red Hot"  (Mars, Neil, Sixx)  3:43 
 "Piece of Your Action"  (Neil, Sixx)  4:16 
 "Girls, Girls, Girls"  (Lee, Mars, Sixx)  3:34 
 "Same Ol' Situation (S.O.S.)"  (Lee, Mars, Neil, Sixx)  4:26 
 "Home Sweet Home"  (Lee, Neil, Sixx)  5:10 
 "Looks That Kill"  (Sixx)  4:34 
 "Dr. Feelgood"  (Mars, Sixx)  6:33 
 "Smokin' in the Boys Room"  (Koda, Lutz)  4:18 
 "Live Wire"  (Sixx)  5:39

Credits
Vince Neil – lead vocals
Brent Woods –  guitar
Jamie Hunting – bass guitar
Brent Fitz – drums, keyboards

References

Vince Neil albums
2003 live albums
Albums recorded at the Whisky a Go Go